Cornelius John "Neil" Berry (January 11, 1922 – August 24, 2016) was a Major League Baseball infielder who played seven seasons in the American League with the Detroit Tigers (1948–1952), St. Louis Browns / Baltimore Orioles (1953, 1954), and Chicago White Sox (1953).

Born in Kalamazoo, Michigan, Berry attended Western Michigan University and signed with the Detroit Tigers in 1942 at age 20.  He made it to the major leagues in 1948 as a utility infielder for Detroit, playing 41 games at shortstop and at 26 games at second base.  With the retirement of Eddie Mayo, Berry became the Tigers' starting second baseman in 1949, hitting only .237 with 18 RBIs in 329 at bats.  In 1950, Berry lost the starting second baseman job to Jerry Priddy and had only forty (40) at bats.

Berry continued as a utility infielder for Detroit in 1951 and 1952, playing mostly as a shortstop.  At the end of the 1952 season, the Tigers traded Berry to the St. Louis Browns.  He played in 57 games for the Browns in 1953, but was released in late August and claimed off waivers by the Chicago White Sox on September 1, 1953.  He played in only five games for the White Sox and finished his playing career playing five games with the Baltimore Orioles in 1954.  In his major league career, Berry played in 442 games with a .244 batting average, 835 assists, 612 putouts, 177 double plays, 265 hits, 148 runs scored, 74 RBIs, 28 doubles and no home runs.

References

External links

1922 births
2016 deaths
Major League Baseball infielders
Detroit Tigers players
St. Louis Browns players
Chicago White Sox players
Baltimore Orioles players
Baseball players from Michigan
Sportspeople from Kalamazoo, Michigan
Western Michigan University alumni